The town of Marineland was established in 1940 and is in Flagler and St. Johns counties, Florida, United States. The population was 16 in the 2010 census. The Marineland marine park and the town of Marineland have become synonymous, however many do not realize that Marineland is a town in its own right. Like all proper municipalities, Marineland has its own local governing body complete with a mayor and city council board that meets monthly to discuss the town's affairs. The town shares a ZIP Code with St. Augustine Beach.

The town of Marineland got its start when the Marineland Dolphin Adventure opened on June 23, 1938, as Marine Studios, a facility designed for Hollywood filmmakers to create underwater footage for motion pictures and newsreels. Popularly known as the "World's First Oceanarium," Marine Studios was the premier destination to allow the general public to experience marine life up-close.

Because of their proximity, the local businesses share close partnerships and vision.  The town of Marineland is a hub of research and conservation and is set in the middle of the GTM-NERR (Guana Tolomato Matanzas National Estuarine Research Reserve), local businesses and foundations have close working relationships including Mobius Marine, Inc., Ripple Effect Eco Tours, Marineland Marina, Marineland Dolphin Adventure, University of Florida Whitney Laboratory, the Florida Master Naturalist Program, the southern facility for the GTM NERR, and Washington Oaks Gardens State Park and Faver-Dykes State Park.

The Flagler County portion of Marineland is part of the Deltona–Daytona Beach–Ormond Beach, FL metropolitan statistical area, while the St. Johns County portion is part of the Jacksonville Metropolitan Statistical Area.

Geography

Demographics

As of the census of 2000, there were 6 people, 3 households, and 0 families residing in the town. The population density was 17.7 people per square mile (6.8/km2). There were 8 housing units at an average density of 23.5 per square mile (9.1/km2). The racial makeup of the town was 100.00% White.

There were 3 households, out of which 33.3% had children under the age of 18 living with them, 33.3% were married couples living together, and 66.7% were non-families. 66.7% of all households were made up of individuals, and 33.3% had someone living alone who was 65 years of age or older. The average household size was 2.00 and the average family size was 4.00.

In the town, the population was spread out, with 33.3% under the age of 18, 33.3% from 25 to 44, 16.7% from 45 to 64, and 16.7% who were 65 years of age or older. The median age was 26 years. For every 100 females, there were 500.0 males. For every 100 females age 18 and over, there were 300.0 males.

The median income for a household in the town was $30,625, and the median income for a family was $21,250. Males had a median income of $31,250 versus $0 for females. The per capita income for the town was $12,000. None of the population and none of the families were below the poverty line.

Education

The St. Johns County portion is within the St. Johns County School District. Zoned schools include W. D. Hartley Elementary School, Gamble Rogers Middle School, and Pedro Menendez High School.

See also

 List of paved Florida bike trails

References

 

Towns in Flagler County, Florida
Towns in St. Johns County, Florida
Towns in the Jacksonville metropolitan area
Towns in Florida
Populated coastal places in Florida on the Atlantic Ocean
1940 establishments in Florida
Populated places established in 1940